The name Betsy has been used for six tropical cyclones worldwide: three in the Atlantic Ocean, two in the Australian region, and one in the South-West Indian Ocean.

In the Atlantic:
 Hurricane Betsy (1956), Category 3 major hurricane, caused severe crop and structural damage in Guadeloupe and Puerto Rico
 Hurricane Betsy (1961), Category 4 hurricane, did not make landfall
 Hurricane Betsy (1965), Category 4 major hurricane, struck the Bahamas, Florida, and Louisiana

In the Australian region:
 Tropical Cyclone Betsy (1968)
 Cyclone Betsy (1992), Category 4 severe tropical cyclone, affected various South Pacific island nations 

In the South-West Indian:
 Tropical Depression Betsy (1970)

Atlantic hurricane set index articles
Australian region cyclone set index articles
South-West Indian Ocean cyclone set index articles